Otto Kallir (born Otto Nirenstein, April 1, 1894, in Vienna – November 30, 1978, in New York) was an Austrian-American art historian, author, publisher and gallerist. He was awarded the Silbernes Ehrenzeichen für Verdienste um das Land Wien in 1968.

Austria 
Nirenstein attended the Akademisches Gymnasium (Academic High School) in Vienna from 1904 to 1912. After serving in the Austrian Army during World War I, he studied at the Technische Hochschule Vienna Technical Institute) from 1919 to 1920. Also in 1919, he began a career in publishing by establishing the Verlag Neuer Graphik, a division of the Rikola Verlag.

Among the most important publications of Verlag Neuer Graphik was Das graphische Werk von Egon Schiele, a portfolio containing the first editions of the artist's six etchings and two of his lithographs. In 1923, Nirenstein established the Neue Galerie (still operating, under different ownership, as the Galerie nächst St. Stephan), which opened with the first major posthumous exhibition of Schiele's work. Eventually, Nirenstein became an internationally recognized art dealer, representing Gustav Klimt, Oskar Kokoschka, Egon Schiele and Alfred Kubin. In 1931, he rescued the work of Richard Gerstl from oblivion. Nirenstein also salvaged the estate of Peter Altenberg, creating a permanent gallery installation featuring the contents of the poet's former hotel room. Additionally, the Neue Galerie exhibited contemporary Austrian artists such as Herbert Böckl, Anton Faistauer, Gerhard Frankl, Ludwig Heinrich Jungnickel, Oskar Laske and Otto Rudolf Schatz, as well as nineteenth-century Austrian masters like Anton Romako and Ferdinand Georg Waldmüller. At a time when Austrians were still relatively unfamiliar with European modernism, Nirenstein mounted one-man shows of work by Lovis Corinth, Edvard Munch, Auguste Renoir, Paul Signac and Vincent van Gogh.

In 1922, Nirenstein married the Baroness Franziska von Löwenstein-Scharffeneck. The following year, to celebrate the birth of their son, John Kallir, he changed the name of his publishing house to Johannes Presse. Like the Verlag Neuer Graphik, the Johannes Presse specialized in limited-edition books and portfolios containing original prints. A daughter, Evamarie Kallir, was born in 1925.

In 1928, Nirenstein collaborated with the Hagenbund artists' association to mount a major exhibition commemorating the tenth anniversary of Egon Schiele's death. Paintings were exhibited at the Hagenbund, works on paper at the Neue Galerie. Two years later, Nirenstein published the first catalogue raisonné of Schiele's paintings, Egon Schiele: Persönlichkeit und Werk.

Also in 1930, he received his doctorate in art history from the University of Vienna. In 1933 Otto Nirenstein legally changed his name to Kallir, adopting a name that had been in his family for many generations.

In 1937 he helped Frederich Welz organize a Waldmüller exhibition in Salzburg.

Emigration 

After the Nazis annexed Austria in 1938, Kallir faced imminent persecution, not only because he was Jewish, but also because he had actively supported the Schuschnigg government. Compelled to emigrate, he sold the Neue Galerie to his secretary Vita Künstler, who was not Jewish. This was a rare example of a "friendly Aryanization." Künstler preserved the gallery as best she could and voluntarily returned it to Kallir after World War II. Because the modern artists represented by the Neue Galerie were not subject to Austria's export laws in 1938, and most were in any case considered "degenerate" by the Nazis, Kallir was able to bring a significant inventory with him into exile. He, his wife and their two children initially settled in Lucerne, Switzerland. But the Swiss would not give him a work permit, and so he traveled on to Paris. Here he founded the Galerie St. Etienne, named after Vienna's central landmark, the Cathedral of St. Stephen. The French refused to admit the rest of the Kallir family, however, and so they had to find a country that would take them all. In 1939, they emigrated to the United States, bringing a significant portion of his inventory.

In the same year, Kallir established the New York Galerie St. Etienne, where he introduced Austrian and German expressionist art to the United States.

In Paris, Kallir had naturally associated with other Austrian refugees, and he became friendly with Otto von Habsburg, the pretender to the Austrian throne. Almost immediately after arriving in New York, Kallir joined the board of the Austrian-American League, one of several semi-political émigré groups. He was appointed chairman in 1940. The League organized "artistic evenings" and helped recent arrivals adapt to life in the US. As chairman of the League, Kallir endeavored to secure US visas and affidavits for Austrian refugees, eventually arranging for the safe passage of about 80 immigrants. Kallir was also concerned that, if the US entered the war, Austrians as enemy aliens might have their assets confiscated or be restricted in their ability to move freely. In 1941, he convinced Otto von Habsburg, who had recently arrived in America, to accompany him to Washington D.C., where they met with the Attorney General, Francis Biddle. They convinced Biddle that Austrians were victims, not accomplices, of Hitler. In 1942, after the US had entered the war, Austria was officially recognized as a neutral country, an action that had the desired effect for Austrian residents of the US, but also unforeseen consequences in Austria after the war.

Otto Kallir and Wilhelm Plöchl

Willibald Plöchl was the founder of the Free Austrian National Council, a rival of the Austrian-American League. He held  Kallir responsible for the differences that had developed between him and Otto von Habsburg. This led members of Plöchl's group to denounce Kallir to the FBI as a "former agent of Hitler and Mussolini" who had dealt with looted art. The accusation caused Kallir to suffer a near-fatal heart attack on December 12, 1942. After a long convalescence, he resigned from the Austrian-American League and thereafter ceased any involvement in politics. The Washington Daily News, which had printed an article about Kallir's alleged Nazi connections, issued a formal apology. The FBI closed its investigation with a statement from J. Edgar Hoover confirming that the affair had been instigated by the jealousy of a rival political group. On April 14, 1942, Otto von Habsburg wrote to the OSS (Office of Strategic Services, predecessor of the CIA): "Kallir was attacked from many sides. It appears those attacks were unjustified. Kallir is honest, but very incompetent in politics."

United States 

In 1939, when Kallir established the Galerie St. Etienne in New York, the Austrian modernists had very little international recognition or market value.  Through repeated showings, sales and gifts to museums, Kallir gradually established the reputations of Gustav Klimt, Oskar Kokoschka, Alfred Kubin and Egon Schiele. The Galerie St. Etienne organized the first American one-person shows of such artists as Erich Heckel (1955), Klimt (1959), Kokoschka (1940), Kubin (1941), Paula Modersohn-Becker (1958), and Egon Schiele (1941). During the 1940s, when works by the Austrian masters were almost impossible to sell, Kallir achieved a major success with the "discovery" of the self-taught octogenarian painter Anna Mary Robertson Moses. Known worldwide as "Grandma" Moses, she was one of the most famous artists of the Cold-War years, and the most successful female painter of her time.

Kallir's approach relied heavily on cooperation with museums and scholarship.  In 1960, he collaborated with Thomas Messer to organize the first American museum exhibition of Schiele's work. It opened at Boston's Institute of Contemporary Art (of which Messer was then director) and traveled to five additional venues.  In 1965, after Messer had been appointed Director of the Guggenheim Museum in New York, Kallir convinced him to mount a major Klimt/Schiele show.  In 1966, Kallir issued an updated edition of his Schiele catalogue raisonné,  Egon Schiele: Oeuvre Catalogue of the Paintings, which was followed, in 1970, by a catalogue raisonné of the artist's prints, Egon Schiele: The Graphic Work.

He also authored catalogues raisonnés documenting the oeuvres of Grandma Moses (1973) and Richard Gerstl (1974).
	
During his first years in America, Kallir was inclined to see himself and his fellow refugees as victims of Nazism, but after the war he was forced to acknowledge the collusion of many who had remained behind. Given his connections in the exile community and his knowledge of prewar art collections, Kallir made a special effort to assist collectors in recovering art that has been stolen during the Hitler years. In most cases, he met with fierce resistance on the part of the Austrian museums and legal establishment. However, in 1998, Kallir's records facilitated the seizure of a stolen Schiele painting, Portrait of Wally, on loan from Austria to the Museum of Modern Art. The case caused Austria to revamp its restitution laws, permitting the return of many looted artworks.

Upon Kallir's death in 1978, the Galerie St. Etienne was taken over by his long-time associate, Hildegard Bachert, and his granddaughter, Jane Kallir. It continues under their directorship.

The Neue Galerie in Vienna, run by various directors after the war, was formally dissolved in 1975. Its archives were donated to the Österreichischen Galerie im Belvedere. Otto Kallir's family donated his collection of historical autographs to the Wienbibliothek im Rathaus in 2008. Additional archival materials can be found at the Galerie St. Etienne and the Leo Baeck Institute in New York.

Art Dealing During The Nazi Era

Kallir's involvement with the Nazi regime has become a matter of controversy among art historians and Holocaust researchers. In 2007, letters were discovered in archives that detailed an art sale to a Nazi agent as Kallir was in the process of fleeing Austria following the Anschluss. "Hitler wanted Portrait of a Young Lady by Ferdinand Georg Waldmüller, one of his favorite painters. And Kallir, willing or not, was the dealer who got it for him." The letters demonstrate, however, that Kallir was pressured by both the agent and the owner of the painting, an evident Nazi. Kallir made no money on the transaction and subsequently wrote the owner: “This entire episode has been extremely unpleasant for me.”

Several claims for restitution concerning artworks handled by Kallir have been filed in United States courts with mixed results. In the case concerning Oscar Kokoschka's Two Nudes, in which the Museum of Fine Arts in Boston sued the claimant, Claudia Seger-Thomschitz,  the judge ruled in favor of the museum. 

In the case of Schiele's watercolors, “Woman Hiding Her Face” (1912) and “Woman in a Black Pinafore” (1911), the judge ruled in favor of the heirs of Holocaust victim, the cabaret artist Fritz Grünbaum. Kallir had purchased "Woman Hiding Her Face" from Eberhard Kornfeld and sold them to Richard Nagy. Nagy's attempts to appeal the ruling were unsuccessful. In 2019, the Appellate Division First Department in New York confirmed the ruling in favor of Grünbaum's heirs. In 2022, the New York Court of Appeals reconfirmed the ruling to the return of the looted Schiele drawings to the Grünbaum heirs. 

In an earlier case  involving a Schiele decided before the passage of the Holocaust Expropriated Art Recovery Act of 2016, the judge ruled in favor of the owner, David Bakalar, who had filed for summary judgement. The case turned on the defense of “laches,” an "equitable doctrine asserted by Bakalar that bars title actions in which there has been a lengthy delay in filing a claim". The judge stated, “After more than two years of discovery in connection with this litigation and the benefit of archival research unavailable in 1956, Defendants have not produced any concrete evidence that the Nazis looted the Drawing or that it was otherwise taken from Grünbaum.” 

Kallir's role concerning Nazi-looted art inhabits what Professor Jonathan Petropoulos called a "gray zone" with regard to the Nazis.

Awards
•	1968: Silbernes Ehrenzeichen für Verdienste um das Land Wien

Publications

 Otto Kallir, Egon Schiele: Oeuvre Catalogue of the Paintings (Crown Publishers, New York: 1966).
 Otto Kallir. Egon Schiele: The Graphic Work (Crown, New York: 1970).
 Otto Kallir, Grandma Moses (Abrams: New York: 1973).
 Otto Kallir, Richard Gerstl (1883–1908): Beitrāge zur Dokumentation seines Lebens und Werkes (Counsel Press: New York, 1974).
 Jane Kallir, Saved From Europe (Galerie St. Etienne, New York: 1999). 
 Jane Kallir, Austria's Expressionism (Rizzoli, New York: 1981).
 Otto Kallir: Ein Wegbereiter Österreichischer Kunst (exhibition catalogue with texts by Hans Bisanz, Jane Kallir and Vita Maria Künstler; Historisches Museum der Stadt Wien, Vienna: 1986)

External Links 

 Reif v Nagy
 EGON SCHIELE The Complete Works Online

See Also 

 German Expressionism
 The Holocaust in Austria
 Eberhard Kornfeld
 Fritz Grünbaum

References 

1894 births
1978 deaths
Jewish emigrants from Austria to the United States after the Anschluss
Austrian publishers (people)
Austrian art historians
Businesspeople from Vienna
TU Wien alumni